Makashvili (Georgian: მაყაშვილი) is a Georgian surname that may refer to the following notable people:
Abel Makashvili (1860–1920), Georgian prince and soldier
Levan Makashvili (born 1989), Georgian-American mixed martial artist 
Maro Makashvili (1901–1921), Georgian nurse

Georgian-language surnames